Peter Benoit (17 August 18348 March 1901) was a Flemish composer of Belgian nationality.

Biography
Petrus Leonardus Leopoldus Benoit was born in Harelbeke, Flanders, Belgium in 1834.  He was taught music at an early age by his father and the village organist. In 1851 Benoit entered the Brussels Conservatoire, where he remained till 1855, studying primarily with FJ Fétis. During this period he composed music to many melodramas, and to the opera Le Village dans les montagnes for the Park Theatre, of which in 1856 he became the resident conductor. In 1857 he won the Belgian Prix de Rome for his cantata Le Meurtre d'Abel. The accompanying money grant enabled him to travel through Germany. In the course of his journings he found time to write a considerable amount of music, as well as an essay called L'École de musique flamande et son avenir.

Fétis loudly praised his Messe solennelle, which Benoit composed in Brussels on his return from Germany. In 1861 he visited Paris for the production of his opera Le Roi des Aulnes ("The Erl King"), which, though accepted by the Théâtre Lyrique, was never performed. (He also composed a work for piano and orchestra called Le Roi des Aulnes.) While there he conducted at the Théâtre des Bouffes Parisiens. Again returning home in 1863, he astonished the musical community with the production in Antwerp of a sacred tetralogy, consisting of his Cantate de Noël, the above-mentioned Mass, a Te Deum and a Requiem, in which were embodied to a large extent his theories about Flemish music. At that time he also came under influence of a novelist Hendrik Conscience.

Benoit passionately pursued the founding of an entirely separate Flemish school, and to that purpose even changed his name from the French "Pierre" to the Dutch equivalent "Peter". Through prodigious effort he succeeded in gathering a small group of enthusiasts who recognized with him the potential for a Flemish school that would differ completely from the French and German schools. However, these intentions failed, as the school's faith was tied too closely to Benoit's music, which was hardly more Flemish than it was French or German.

Benoit's most important compositions include the Flemish oratorios De Schelde (The river Scheldt) and Lucifer (which met complete failure when it was staged in London in 1888), the operas Het Dorp in 't Gebergte (The village in the mountains) and Isa, and the Drama Christi, a huge body of songs, choruses, small cantatas and motets. Benoit also wrote a great number of essays on musical matters.

He also composed a Flute Concerto (Symphonic Tale), Op. 43a, and a Piano Concerto (Symphonic Tale), Op. 43b.

He died in Antwerp on 8 March 1901, aged 66. In Harelbeke a museum remembers of his life and work, called the Peter Benoit Huis.

Honours 
 1881: Commander in the Order of Leopold.
 1882: Member of the Royal Academy of Science, Letters and Fine Arts of Belgium.

Notes

References

External links

Biography on Famous Belgians
Biography on Naxos.com

 Biography at SVM

1834 births
1901 deaths
19th-century classical composers
19th-century Belgian male musicians
Belgian classical composers
Belgian male classical composers
Belgian opera composers
Members of the Royal Academy of Belgium
Flemish composers
Male opera composers
People from Harelbeke
Prix de Rome (Belgium) winners
Pupils of François-Joseph Fétis
Romantic composers
20th-century Belgian male musicians
Oratorio composers